José Oliveira may refer to:

 José Oliveira (footballer, born 1997), Timor-Leste football player
 José Oliveira (footballer, born 2002), Portuguese football goalkeeper
 José Manuel Oliveira (born 1967), Spanish racing cyclist
 José María Oliveira, Spanish film director

See also 
 José de Oliveira (disambiguation)